Christine of Mecklenburg-Güstrow (14 August 1663 – 3 August 1749) was a German noblewoman of the House of Mecklenburg and by marriage Countess of Stolberg-Gedern.

Born in Güstrow, she was the sixth of eleven children born from the marriage of Gustav Adolph, Duke of Mecklenburg-Güstrow and Magdalene Sibylle of Holstein-Gottorp. From her ten older and younger siblings, eight survived to adulthood: Marie (by marriage Duchess of Mecklenburg-Strelitz), Magdalene, Sophie (by marriage Duchess of Württemberg-Oels), Charles, Hereditary Prince of Mecklenburg-Güstrow, Hedwig (by marriage Duchess of Saxe-Merseburg-Zörbig), Louise (by marriage Queen of Denmark and Norway), Elisabeth (by marriage Duchess of Saxe-Merseburg-Spremberg) and Augusta.

Life
In Güstrow on 14 May 1683, Christine married Louis Christian, Count of Stolberg-Gedern (1652–1710) as his second wife. Between 1684 and 1705 she had 23 children in 19 pregnancies (including 4 sets of twins). From them, only 11 survive to adulthood:

Gustav Adolph, Hereditary Prince of Stolberg-Gedern (born and died Gedern, 17 January 1684).
A daughter (born and died Gedern, 17 January 1684), twin of Gustav Adolph.
Gustav Ernest, Hereditary Prince of Stolberg-Gedern (Gedern, 10 March 1685 - Gedern, 14 June 1689).
Fredericka Charlotte (Gedern, 3 April 1686 - Laubach, 10 January 1739), married on 8 December 1709 to Frederick Ernest, Count of Solms-Laubach.
Emilie Auguste (Gedern, 11 May 1687 - Rossla, 30 June 1730), married on 1 October 1709 to Jost Christian, Count of Stolberg-Rossla (her first-cousin).
Christiana Louise (Gedern, 6 April 1688 - Gedern, 11 August 1691).
Albertine Antonie (Gedern, 15 April 1689 - Gedern, 16 August 1691).
Charles Louis, Hereditary Prince of Stolberg-Gedern (Gedern, 15 April 1689 - Gedern, 6 August 1691), twin of Albertine Antonie.
Gustave Magdalene (Gedern, 6 April 1690 - Gedern, 22 March 1691).
Christian Ernest, Count of Stolberg-Wernigerode (Gedern, 2 April 1691 - Wernigerode, 25 October 1771).
Christine Eleonore (Gedern, 12 September 1692 - Büdingen, 30 January 1745), married on 8 August 1708 to Ernest Casimir I, Count of Isenburg-Büdingen in Büdingen.
Frederick Charles, Prince of Stolberg-Gedern (Gedern, 11 October 1693 - Gedern, 28 September 1767).
Ernestine Wilhelmine (Gedern, 29 January 1695 - Wächtersbach, 7 May 1759), married on 7 December 1725 to Ferdinand Maximilian, Count of Isenburg-Büdingen in Wächtersbach.
Fredericka Louise (Gedern, 20 January 1696 - Gedern, 24 April 1697).
Louis Adolph (Gedern, 17 June 1697 - Gedern, 6 January 1698).
Henry August, Count of Stolberg-Schwarza (Gedern, 17 June 1697 - Schwarza, 14 September 1748), twin of Louis Adolph.
Sophie Christiane (Gedern, 17 August 1698 - Gedern, 14 June 1771), unmarried.
Ferdinande Henriette (Gedern, 2 October 1699 - Schönberg, Odenwald, 31 January 1750), married on 15 December 1719 to George August, Count of Erbach-Schönberg. Through her, Christine was the great-great-great-grandmother of Queen Victoria of the United Kingdom.
Rudolph Lebrecht (Gedern, 17 September 1701 - Gedern, 6 April 1702).
Louis Christian (Gedern, 17 September 1701 - Gedern, 22 November 1701), twin of Rudolph Lebrecht.
Auguste Marie (Gedern, 28 November 1702 - Herford, 3 July 1768), a nun in Herford, created Princess in 1742.
Caroline Adolphine (Gedern, 27 April 1704 - Gedern, 10 February 1707).
Philippina Louise (Gedern, 20 October 1705 - Philippseich, 1 November 1744), married on 2 April 1725 to William Maurice II, Count of Isenburg-Philippseich.

References 

Christine
1663 births
1749 deaths
Daughters of monarchs